A number of notable people have the surname Singh:

Notable people

A
A. G. Kripal Singh (Amritsar Govindsingh Kripal Singh; 1933–1987), Indian Test cricketer, son of A. G. Ram Singh, brother of A. G. Milkha Singh
A. G. Milkha Singh (Amritsar Govindsingh Milkha Singh; 1941–2017), Indian Test cricketer
A. G. Ram Singh (Amritsar Govindsingh Ram Singh; 1910–1999), Indian first-class cricketer
Aakanksha Singh (born 1990), Indian actress
Aarti Singh (born Aarti Sharma), Indian television actress
Balls Mahoney (Jonathan Rechner, also known as Abbudah Singh; 1972–2016), American professional wrestler
Abhimanyu Singh (born 1975), Indian film actor who works mainly in Bollywood and Telugu cinema
Abhishek Singh (disambiguation)
Ajai K. Singh (born 1953), Indian inorganic chemist and professor 
Ajay Singh (disambiguation)
Ajit Singh (disambiguation)
Akali Phula Singh (1761–1823), Sikh leader
Akashdeep Singh (born 1994), Indian field hockey player
Akhilesh Prasad Singh (born 1962), Member of the Lok Sabha, the lower house of the Parliament of India, for Motihari, Bihar (2004–2009)
Akhilesh Pratap Singh (born 1960), Member of the Uttar Pradesh Legislative Assembly (2012–2017)
Akshay Pratap Singh (born 1970), Member of the Lok Sabha for Pratapgarh, Uttar Pradesh (2004–2009)
Alvin Singh (born 1988), Fijian footballer
Amandeep Singh (disambiguation)
Amar Singh (disambiguation)
Amarinder Singh (born 1942), Chief Minister of Punjab (from 2017)
Amarjit Singh (born 1970), British former wrestler
Amit Singh (born 1981), Indian first-class cricketer
Amitabha Singh, Indian cinematographer and film producer
Amitoze Singh (born 1989), Indian first-class cricketer
Amjyot Singh (born 1992), Indian basketball player
Amrinder Singh (born 1993), Indian football goalkeeper
Amrit Singh (cyclist) (born 1991), Indian track cyclist
Amrita Singh (born 1958), Indian film and television actress
Amritpal Singh (disambiguation)
Analjit Singh (born 1954), Indian businessman
Anand Singh (disambiguation)
Anil Singh (disambiguation)
Anmolpreet Singh, Indian cricketer 
Annu Raj Singh (born 1984), Indian shooter
Anshuman Singh (born 1935), Governor of the Indian states of Gujarat (1998–1999) and Rajasthan (1999–2003)
Anshuman Singh (cricketer) (born 1999), Indian cricketer
Anurag Singh (disambiguation)
Anureet Singh (born 1988), Indian cricketer.
Anushka Singh (born 1964), Indian TV actress 
Archana Puran Singh (born 1962), Actress, Reality television judges
Ari Singh II (after 1724 – 1773), Maharana of Mewar, (1762–1772).
Arijit Singh (born 1987), Indian Bengali singer
Arjun Jang Bahadur Singh, Nepali Congress politician and royalty of Bajhang
Arjun Singh (1930–2011), Minister of Human Resource Development of India (2004–2009)
Arpita Singh (born 1937), Indian artist
Arshdeep Singh (born 1997), Indian football goalkeeper
Arun Singh (disambiguation)
Arunoday Singh (born 1983), Indian film actor
Ashok Singh (disambiguation)
Ashutosh Singh (tennis) (born 1982), Indian tennis player
Ashutosh Singh (cricketer) (born 1994), Indian cricketer

B
B. P. Singh (Brijendra Pal Singh) (born 1935), Indian television producer
Baba Singh (disambiguation)
Babaji Singh (1947–2006), Mexican Sikh translator
Baban Singh, Nepalese politician
Babu Amar Singh, revolutionary in the Indian Rebellion of 1857, brother of the Kunwar Singh
Babu Bhoop Singh, ruler of Kohra and prominent leader in Indian Rebellion of 1857
Babu Nath Singh, Member of the Lok Sabha, the lower house of the Parliament of India, for Surguja, Madhya Pradesh (1952–1977)
Babu Singh, Member of the Rajasthan Legislative Assembly (from 2013)
Bachchu Singh, Member of the Rajasthan Legislative Assembly (from 2013)
Bachittar Singh (1664–1705), Sikh martyr, general of Guru Gobind Singh
Badan Singh (died 1755 or 1756), first Raja of the Bharatpur State (from 1722)
Badlu Singh (1876–1918), Indian recipient of the Victoria Cross
Baghel Singh (c. 1730 – c. 1802), leader of the Singh Krora Misl
Bahadur Singh (disambiguation)
Baj Singh, also known as Baj Bahadur (died 1716), Sikh general, governor, scholar and martyr
Bajrang Bahadur Singh (1906–1973), Lieutenant Governor of the Indian state of Himachal Pradesh (1955–1963)
Bakht Singh (Maharaja) (1706–1752), Maharaja of Jodhpur and Marwar
Bakht Singh (1903–2000), Christian evangelist in India
Bakshish Singh (1928–1970), Indian field hockey player
Bal Krishna Singh (born 1916), Member of the Lok Sabha for Chandauli, Uttar Pradesh (1962–1967)
Bala Singh (1952–2019), Indian Tamil actor
Balak Singh (1797–1862), founder of the Namdhari Sikh sect
Balbhadra Singh (politician) (1916–1986), Raja of Raghogarh (1945–1967), Member of the Madhya Pradesh Legislative Assembly (1952–1957)
Balbir Singh (disambiguation)
Baldeep Singh (born 1982), Indian football defender
Baldeep Singh (footballer, born 1987), Indian football central midfielder
Baldeo Singh (died 1825), Maharaja of the Bharatpur State (from 1823)
Baldev Singh (disambiguation)
Baljinder Singh (born 1986), Indian racewalkerb
Baljit Singh (disambiguation)
Balkaur Singh, Member of the Haryana Legislative Assembly
Balkrishan Singh (1933–2004), Indian field hockey player
Balmiki Prasad Singh (born 1942), Governor of the Indian state of Sikkim (2008–2013)
Baltej Singh (born 1990), Indian first-class cricketer
Balvir Singh, Freeholder in the Burlington County, New Jersey (from 2018)
Balwant Singh (disambiguation)
Balwinder Singh, also known as Fidda or Fiddu, Indian Kabaddi player
Bana Singh (born 1949), Indian soldier and recipient of the Param Vir Chakra, the highest Indian military decoration
Bandeep Singh (born 1989), Indian first-class cricketer 
Banshi Singh (born 1962), Member of the Uttar Pradesh Legislative Assembly (2012–2017)
Bant Singh, Indian agricultural labour activist and singer
Bantoo Singh (born 1963), Indian first-class cricketer
Barkha Singh (born 1992), Indian actress and model
Barry Singh, artistic director and conductor of the Northern Rivers Symphony Orchestra
Basant Narain Singh (born 1918), Member of the Lok Sabha for Hazaribagh, Jharkhand (1962–1971, 1977–1984)
Basant Singh (born 1990), Indian football goalkeeper
Basanta Singh (born 1994), Indian football midfielder
Basawon Singh or Basawon Sinha (1909–1989), Indian independence activist 
Bashistha Narain Singh, representative of the Indian state of Bihar in the Rajya Sabha, the upper house of the Indian Parliament (from 2012)
Bedashwor Singh (born 1998), Indian football midfielder 
Beant Singh (disambiguation)
Bhabananda Singh (born 1960), representative of the Indian state of Manipur in the Rajya Sabha, the upper house of the Indian Parliament (from 2017)
Bhagat Singh (1907–1931), Indian revolutionary
Bhagvat Singh (1865–1944), Maharaja of the Gondal State (from 1869)
Bhagwan Singh (1916–1995), High Commissioner of India to Fiji (1971–1976)
Bhagwan Singh (politician), Member of the Madhya Pradesh Legislative Assembly (1957–1967)
Bhagwant Singh of Mewar (1927–1984), titular ruler of the Mewar (Udaipur) State (1955–1971)
Bhagwati Singh, representative of the Indian state of Uttar Pradesh in the Rajya Sabha (2004–2010)
Bhalindra Singh (1919–1992), Indian cricketer, President of Indian Olympic Association (1960–1975, 1980–1984), son of Bhupinder Singh of Patiala
Bharat Singh (born 1948), Member of the Lok Sabha for Ballia, Uttar Pradesh (from 2014)
Bharatinder Singh (born 1988), Indian decathlete
Bharti Singh (born 1984), Indian stand-up comedian and actress
Bhawani Singh (politician) (born 25 May 1911), Member of the 1st Lok Sabha (1952–1957)
Bhawani Singh (1931–2011), last Maharaja of Jaipur
Bhim Singh (disambiguation)
Bhishma Narain Singh (1933–2018), Governor of the Indian state of Assam (1984–1989)
Bhola Singh (born 1939), politician from the Indian state of Bihar
Bhola Singh (UP politician) (born 1977), politician from the Indian state of Uttar Pradesh
Bhopinder Singh (born 1946), Lieutenant Governor of The Andaman and Nicobar Islands (2006–2013)
Bhrigu Nath Singh, also known as B. N. Singh (born 1968), Indian aerospace engineer
Bhupal Singh (1884–1955), Maharana of Udaipur (1930–1949), Rajpramukh of Rajasthan (from 1948)
Bhupendra Singh (disambiguation)
Bhupinder Singh (disambiguation)
Bidyananda Singh (born 1997), Indian football defensive midfielder
Bijendra Singh (born 1956), Member of the Lok Sabha for Aligrah, Uttar Pradesh (2004–2009)
Bikram Singh (disambiguation)
Bikramjeet Singh (born 1993), Indian football defender
Bikramjit Singh (born 1992), Indian football midfielder
Billy Arjan Singh (1917–2010), Indian conservationist 
Binod Singh (fl. 1705–1716), Sikh military leader
Bipin Singh (born 1995), Indian football midfielder
Birender Singh (disambiguation)
Bishambar Singh (1940–2004), Indian bantamweight wrestler
Bishamber Singh (born 1969), Member of the Haryana Legislative Assembly
Bishan Singh (1672–1699), Maharaja of Amer (Jaipur) (1688–1699)
Bishan Singh Ram Singh (1944–2006), Malaysian  environmentalist
Bishnu Bahadur Singh (born 1969), Nepalese boxer
Bishwanath Singh, Indian heavyweight freestyle wrestler
Bobby Singh (born 1975), Indo-Fijian Canadian football player
Bobby Singh (cinematographer) (1974–2012), Indian cinematographer
Bobby Singh (musician), Australian tabla player
Bodhchandra Singh (1909–1955), last ruler of the Kingdom of Manipur (1941–1949)
Boota Singh (died 1955), Sikh soldier of the British Indian Army
Brahmeshwar Singh (1947–2012), head of the Ranvir Sena militant group
Brajesh Singh (died 1966), Indian communist politician
Brihaspat Singh (born 1960), Member of the Chhattisgarh Legislative Assembly (from 2013)
Brij Bhushan Sharan Singh (born 1957), Member of the Lok Sabha for Kaiserganj, Uttar Pradesh (1991–1996 and from 1999)
Brij Singh (born 1963), Indian financier
Brijendra Singh (1918–1995), Maharaja of the Bharatpur State (1929–1947)
Brijesh Singh, Member of the Uttar Pradesh Legislative Assembly (from 2017)
Brijraj Singh (born 1934), Maharao of Kota, Rajasthan (from 1991)
Bubai Singh, Indian football goalkeeper
Buckam Singh (1893–1919), Canadian Sikh war veteran
Budhia Singh (born 2002), Indian long-distance runner
Buta Singh (born 1934), Minister of Home Affairs of India (1986–1989), Governor of the Indian state of Bihar (2004–2006)

C
Chandra Shekhar Singh (1927–2007), 8th Prime Minister of India
Chandrachur Singh (born 1968), Indian actor
Charan Singh (disambiguation)
Charan Singh (1902–1987), 5th Prime Minister of India
Chaya Singh (born 1981), Indian actress
Chinglensana Singh (born 1991), Indian field hockey player
Chinglensana Singh (footballer), also known as Sana Singh (born 1996), Indian footballer 
Chitrangada Singh (born 1976), Indian film actress

D
Dalbir Singh (born 1954), Chief of the Army Staff of the Indian Army (2014–2016)
Dalip Singh (disambiguation)
Daljit Singh (disambiguation)
Dara Singh (disambiguation)
Darshan Singh (disambiguation)
Davendra Singh (born 1950), Fiji Indian politician
Davendra Singh (athlete) (born 1965), Fijian middle-distance runner
David Joseph Singh (born 1958), theoretical physicist
Davinder Singh (disambiguation)
Dayal Singh (disambiguation)
Deepika Singh (born 1989), Indian television actress
Devendra Singh (disambiguation)
Devendro Singh (born 1992), Indian boxer
Devwrat Singh (1969–2021), Indian politician
Digvijay Singh (disambiguation)
Dilbagh Singh (1926–2001), head of the Indian Air Force (1981–1984)
Dilbagh Singh (singer), Indian Punjabi singer-songwriter and film actor
Dinesh Singh (disambiguation)
Dharam Singh (disambiguation)
Dhruv Singh (disambiguation)

E
Ebenezer Sunder Singh (born 1967), Indo-American visual artist
Eisha Singh (born 1998), Indian actress
Ekendra Singh (born 1957), Indian football manager
Elangbam Nilakanta Singh (1927–2000), Indian poet and critic
Er Sanjeev Singh, politician from the Indian state of Bihar

F
Fateh Singh (disambiguation)
Fauja Singh (born 1911), British centenarian marathon runner
Fauja Singh (Sikh leader) (1936–1978), one of 13 Sikhs killed during a protest against the Nirankaris

G
Gabbar Singh (disambiguation)
Gagandeep Singh (disambiguation)
Gajendra Singh (disambiguation)
Ganda Singh, Indian revolutionary, member of the Ghadar Party
Ganda Singh (historian) (1900–1987), Punjabi historian
Ganesh Man Singh (1915–1997), Nepalese politician from Newar caste
Ganga Singh (1880–1943), Maharaja of the princely state of Bikaner
Gaurika Singh (born 2002), Nepalese swimmer
Gama Singh (born 1954), Indian/Canadian professional wrestler
Giriraj Singh (born 1952), Indian politician
Gouramangi Singh (born 1986), Indian footballer
Govin Singh (born 1988), Indian football defender
Gracy Singh (born 1980), Indian actress
Gulab Singh (disambiguation)
Gurbaksh Singh (1895–1977), Punjabi writer
Gurbux Singh (born 1936), Indian field hockey player
Gurdial Singh (mountaineer) (born 1924), Indian mountaineer
Gurdial Singh (1933–2016), Indian Punjabi writer
Gurdial Singh Phul (1911–1989), Indian Punjabi dramatist
Gurkeerat Singh (born 1990), Indian cricketer
Gurmail Singh (disambiguation)
Gurmeet Ram Rahim Singh (born 1967), head of the Indian religious group Dera Sacha Sauda
Gurmeet Singh (racewalker) (born 1985), Indian racewalker
Gurmit Singh (born 1965), Singaporean former actor, host and comedy performer
Gurmukh Singh (disambiguation)
Gurnam Singh (disambiguation)
Gurpreet Singh (disambiguation)
Gurratan Singh, Canadian politician
Guru Gobind Singh (1666–1708), Indian spiritual master, writer, warrior
Gurvinder Singh, Indian film director
Gurvinder Singh (cricketer) (born 1983), Indian cricketer
Gurwinder Singh (born 1986), Indian footballer
Gyan Singh (disambiguation)

H
Hammir Singh or Rana Hammir (1314–1378), ruler of Mewar
Hanut Singh (1900–1982), British Indian Army soldier and polo player
Hanut Singh (soldier) (1933–2015), Lt General of the Indian Army
Harbaksh Singh (1913–1999), three star General in the Indian Army
Harbhajan Singh (poet) (1920–2002), Indian Punjabi poet, critic, cultural commentator, and translator
Harbhajan Singh (basketball) (born 1950), Indian basketball player
Harbhajan Singh (born 1980), Indian cricketer
Harcharan Singh (disambiguation)
Hardeep Singh (disambiguation)
Hari Singh (disambiguation)
Harivansh Narayan Singh (born 1956), Indian journalist, Deputy Chairman of the Rajya Sabha, the upper house of the Parliament of India (from 2018)
Harivansh Singh (born 1950), Member of the Lok Sabha, the lower house of the Parliament of India, for Pratapgarh (from 2014)
Harjeet Singh (born 1996), Indian field hockey player 
Harkirat Singh (disambiguation)
Harmeet Singh (disambiguation)
Harpal Singh (disambiguation)
Harpreet Singh (disambiguation)
Hem Bahadur Singh, Former Inspector General of Nepal Police
Hoshiar Singh (1937–1998), recipient of the Param Vir Chakra, the highest Indian military decoration
Hukam Singh (disambiguation)
Hukum Singh (1938–2018), Member of the Lok Sabha, the lower house of the Parliament of India, for Kairana (2014–2018)

I
Inder Singh (disambiguation)
Inderjit Singh (disambiguation)
Ishar Singh (disambiguation)
Ivy Singh-Lim (born 1949), Singaporean farmer, businesswoman and netball official

J
Jackichand Singh (born 1992), Indian footballer
Jadunath Singh (1916–1948), Indian Army soldier, posthumous recipient of the Param Vir Chakra, the highest Indian military decoration
Jagmeet Singh (born 1979), Canadian New Democratic Party leader
Jagdeep Singh (disambiguation)
Jagjit Singh (disambiguation)
Jagmal Singh (died 1583), son of Udai Singh II, Maharana of Mewar
Jagmal Singh (athlete) (born 1923), Indian long-distance runner
Jai Singh (disambiguation)
Jaideva Singh (1893–1986), Indian musicologist and philosopher
Jamuna Sharan Singh (born 1941), Indian ecologist
Jarnail Singh Bhindranwale (1947-1984), Sikh religious leader 
Jasdev Singh, Indian sports commentator
Jasjit Singh (disambiguation)
Jaskaran Singh (disambiguation)
Jaspal Singh (disambiguation)
Jaswant Singh (disambiguation)
Jaswinder Singh (disambiguation)
Jaya Prithvi Bahadur Singh (1877–1940), Nepalese educator and writer, former vassal king of Bajhang kingdom 
Jeev Milkha Singh (born 1971), Indian golfer
Jitendra Singh (disambiguation)
Jodh Singh (1882–1981), Sikh theologian and social activist
Joginder Singh (disambiguation)

K
Kalyan Singh (born 1932), Governor of Rajasthan (from 2014)
Kanwaljit Singh (disambiguation)
Karam Singh (disambiguation)
Karan Singh (disambiguation)
Karanjit Singh (born 1986), Indian football goalkeeper
Karpal Singh (1940–2014), Malaysian politician and lawyer
Kartar Singh (disambiguation)
Kedarnath Singh (1934–2018), Indian Hindi poet
Kehar Singh (1935–1989), convicted conspirator in the plot of the Indira Gandhi assassination
Kehar Singh (physicist) (born 1941), Indian optical physicist
Khem Karan Singh (born 1921), Lt General of Indian Army
Khushwant Singh (1915–2014), Indian writer and politician
Kirpal Singh (disambiguation)
Kirti Vardhan Singh (born 1966), Member of the Lok Sabha, the lower house of the Parliament of India, for Gonda, Uttar Pradesh (from 2014)
Kishan Singh of Bharatpur (1899–1929), Maharaja of Bharatpur (1918–1929)
Kishan Singh (biologist) (born 1931), Indian plant pathologist
Kishan Singh, Indian polo player
Krishna Singh (disambiguation)
Kumar Suresh Singh (1935–2006), Indian anthropologist
Kunwar Inderjit Singh (born Indradhwaj Shahi), Prime Minister of Nepal and royalty of Doti 
Kunwar Singh (disambiguation)
Kushal Pal Singh (born 1931), Indian real estate developer

L
Lakshman Singh (disambiguation)
Lakshmi Singh, Indian newscaster
Lalji Singh (1947–2017), Indian zoologist and geneticist
Lallan Prasad Singh (1912–1998), Indian civil servant
Lallu Singh (born 1954), Member of the Lok Sabha, the lower house of the Parliament of India, for Faizabad, Uttar Pradesh (from 2014)
Lilly Singh (born 1988), Canadian YouTuber
Linda L. Singh, major general of the Maryland Army National Guard
Lisa Singh (born 1972), Australian politician

M
Mahavir Singh (disambiguation)
Mahender Singh, Indian politician
Mahendra Singh (disambiguation)
Makhan Singh (disambiguation)
 Mamik Singh (born 3 May 1953), Indian TV actor
Man Singh I (1550–1614), general of the Mughal emperor Akbar and Rajput Raja of Amer
Man Singh II (1912–1970), last ruling Maharaja of Jaipur State (1922–1948)
Manandeep Singh (born 1992), Indian footballer
Mandeep Singh (born 1991), Indian cricketer
Mandeep Singh (field hockey) (born 1995), Indian field hockey player
Mangala Devi Singh, Nepalese politician
Manik Singh, Member of the Lok Sabha, the lower house of the Parliament of India, for Sidhi (2007–2009)
  Maninder Singh (born 27 September 1980), Indian TV actor 
Manjeet Singh (disambiguation)
Manjit Singh (disambiguation)
Manjot Singh (cricketer) (born 1987), Australian cricketer
Manjot Singh (born July 1992), Indian film actor
Manmohan Singh (born 1932), Indian Prime Minister (2004–2014)
Manmohan Singh (film director), Indian film director and cinematographer
Manpreet Singh (born 1985), Indiadn amateur boxer
Manpreet Singh (cricketer) (born 1985), Italian cricketer
Manpreet Singh (field hockey) (born 1992), Indian field hockey player
  Manvendra Singh (born 1962), Indian politician 
Martand Singh (1923–1995), Indian wildlife conservationist, Member of the Lok Sabha, the lower house of the Parliament of India, for Rewa (1971–1977, 1980–1989)
Meinam Bhorot Singh, Indian politician
Mika Singh (born 1977), Indian musician
Milan Singh (born 1992), Indian footballer
Milkha Singh (1929–2021), Indian track and field sprinter
Mohan Singh (disambiguation)
Mona Singh (born 1981), Indian actress and television presenter
Mona Singh (scientist), American Professor of Computer Science

N
N. Biren Singh (born 1961), Chief Minister of Manipur (from 2017)
N. Khelchandra Singh (1920–2011), Indian writer, lexicographer and historian
Nagendra Singh (1914–1988), Indian lawyer
Naipal Singh (born 1940), Member of the Lok Sabha, the lower house of the Parliament of India, for Rampur, Uttar Pradesh (from 2014)
Nalini Singh (born 1945), Indian journalist
Nalini Singh (author) (born 1977), New Zealand author
Nalini Singh (human rights activist), Fiji
Natwar Singh (born 1931), Indian bureaucrat
Navdeep Singh (disambiguation)
Nawab Kapur Singh (1697–1753), Jathedar of Akal Takht (from 1737)
Neetu Singh (born 1958), Indian Hindi film actress
Nirbhay N. Singh, psychologist and mindfulness researcher
Niruta Singh, Indian actress
Nishant Singh Malkani (born 1987), Indian model and actor

O
O. Joy Singh, chief of the Manipur People's Party
O. P. Singh (Om Prakash Singh; born 1960), Director General of Uttar Pradesh Police (from 2018)
Okram Bikram Singh (born 1985), Indian track cyclist
Okram Ibobi Singh (born 1948), Chief Minister of the Indian state of Manipur (2002–2017)
Om Prakash Singh, Member of the Legislative Assembly of the Indian state of Uttar Pradesh (2007–2012)
Omkar Singh (born 1984), Indian shooter
Omid Singh (born 1991), Iranian football midfielder
Omprakash Singh (born 1959), Member of the Lok Sabha, the lower house of the Parliament of India, for Ghazipur, Uttar Pradesh (1998–1999)
Onkar Singh (politician), Member of the Uttar Pradesh Legislative Assembly (1952–1957) and Legislative Council (1958–1962)

P
Pankaj Singh (politician) (born 1978), Member of the Legislative Assembly of the Indian state of Uttar Pradesh (from 2017)
Pankaj Singh (born 1985), Indian cricketer
Paramjit Singh (disambiguation)
Parmjit Singh (disambiguation)
Pawan Singh, Indian Bhojpuri playback singer and film actor
Phatte Bahadur Singh (1902–1983), Nepalese writer from Newar caste
Piru Singh (1918–1948), Company Havildar Major of the Indian Army, posthumous recipient of the Param Vir Chakra, the highest Indian military decoration
Prabhjot Singh (field hockey) (born 1980), Indian field hockey forward
Prabhjot Singh (American professor and physician) (born 1982)
Prabhsimran Singh, Indian cricketer and cousin of Anmolpreet Singh. 
Prakash Man Singh (born 1956), Nepalese politician from Newar caste
Pratap Singh (disambiguation)
Pratibha Singh (born 1956), Member of the Lok Sabha, the lower house of the Parliament of India, for Mandi, Himachal Pradesh (2004–2009, 2013–2014)
Princess Shanti Singh of Nepal (1940–2001), Nepalese princess
Pritam Singh (Uttarakhand politician) (born 1958), Indian politician
Pritam Singh (born 1976), Singaporean politician and lawyer
Pritam Singh (footballer) (born 1993), Indian footballer

R
R. K. Singh (born 1952), Indian minister of state (independent charge)
R. P. N. Singh (born 1964), Member of the Lok Sabha, the lower house of the Parliament of India, for Kushi Nagar (2009–2014)
R. P. Singh (born 1985), Indian cricketer,
Rabinder Singh (disambiguation)
Rachna Singh, Canadian politician and trade unionist
Radha Mohan Singh (born 1949), Minister of Agriculture and Farmers Welfare of India (from 2014)
Raghubir Singh (disambiguation)
Raghuraj Pratap Singh (born 1968), Indian politician from Uttar Pradesh
Rahul Singh (disambiguation)
Raj Singh (disambiguation)
Rajendra Singh (disambiguation)
Rajesh Singh (disambiguation)
Rajinder Singh (disambiguation)
Rajiv Singh (born 1958 or 1959), Indian businessman
Rajkumar Singh (disambiguation)
Rajkumari Singh (disambiguation)
Rajnath Singh (born 1951), Minister of Home Affairs of India (from 2014)
Raju Singh (born 1969), Indian film and TV background score composer, music director, singer, and musician
Rajveer Singh (born 1959), Member of the Lok Sabha, the lower house of the Parliament of India, for Etah, Uttar Pradesh (from 2014)
Rakul Preet Singh (born 1990), South Indian film actress and model
Ram Singh (disambiguation)
Raman Singh (born 1952), Chief Minister of the Indian state of Chhattisgarh (from 2003)
Ramandeep Singh (disambiguation)
Ramjee Singh (born 1927), Indian politician, educator, and Gandhian activist
Rampal Singh (disambiguation)
Ranbir Singh (1830–1885), Maharaja of Jammu and Kashmir (from 1857)
Randhir Singh (disambiguation)
Ranjin Singh (born 1975), Indian-American professional wrestling manager and writer
Ranjit Singh (disambiguation)
Rannvijay Singh (born 1983), Indian actor, television personality and VJ
Ranveer Singh (born 1985), Indian actor
Ranvir Singh (born 1977), English television presenter and journalist
Rao Inderjit Singh (born 1951), Indian politician
Ravi Inder Singh (industrialist) (born 1940), Indian industrialist and politician
Ravi Inder Singh (born 1987), Indian cricketer
Ravinder Singh (disambiguation)
Reagan Singh (born 1991), Indian footballer
Renedy Singh (born 1979), Indian former football player and coach
Rinku Singh (born 1988), Indian professional wrestler and retired professional baseball player
Ritika Singh (born 1994), Indian actress and mixed martial artist
Robin Singh (disambiguation)
Roshan Singh (1892–1927), Indian revolutionary
Rudra Pratap Singh (disambiguation)
Rupinder Pal Singh (born 1990), Indian field hockey player

S
S. G. Thakur Singh (1899–1976), Indian artist
S. K. Singh (disambiguation)
Sadhu Singh (born 1941), Member of the Lok Sabha, the lower house of the Parliament of India, for Faridkot, Punjab (from 2014)
Sadhu Singh (athlete), Indian racewalker
Sajjan Singh (disambiguation)
Sam Singh (born 1971), American politician
Sanam Singh (born 1988), Indian tennis player
Sandeep Singh (disambiguation)
Sangram Singh (Sanjeet Kumar; born 1985), Indian wrestler, actor and motivational speaker
Sanjay Singh (disambiguation)
Sara Singh (born c. 1985), Canadian politician
Sarabjit Singh (1963 or 1964–2013), Indian national convicted of terrorism and spying by a Pakistani court
Sarika Singh (disambiguation)
Sartaj Singh (disambiguation)
Satendra Singh (disambiguation)
Satpal Singh (born 1955), Indian wrestler and wrestling coach
Satwant Singh (1962–1989), Sikh bodyguard and assassin of Indira Gandhi
Satyapal Singh (disambiguation)
Saurabh Singh (disambiguation)
Sawarn Singh (born 1990), Indian rower
Schandra Singh (born 1977), American artist
Seityasen Singh (born 1992), Indian footballer
Shabeg Singh (1925–1984), military adviser to Jarnail Singh Bhindranwale, the leader of Damdami Taksal
Shailendra Singh (disambiguation)
Shaitan Singh (1924–1962), Indian Army officer and recipient of the Param Vir Chakra, the highest India highest military decoration
Shakti Singh (disambiguation)
Sher Singh (disambiguation)
Shubhdeep Singh Sidhu, (1993–2022), Indian singer and politician
Shilpa Singh (born 1988), Indian singer, dancer, and model
Sidharth Nath Singh (born 1963), Minister of Health in the Government of the Indian state of Uttar Pradesh (from 2017)
Simon Singh (born 1964), British popular science author
Simone Singh (born 1974), Indian actress
Sobha Singh (disambiguation)
Sophia Duleep Singh (1876–1948), English suffragette
Sonia Singh (born 1964), Indian TV actress 
Sriram Singh (born 1948), Indian track athlete, 800 metres
Sucha Singh (disambiguation)
Suchitra Singh (born 1977), Indian cricketer
Sukhdev Singh (disambiguation)
Sukhwinder Singh (disambiguation)
Sunny Singh (disambiguation)
Surendra Singh (disambiguation)
Surinder Singh (disambiguation)
Sushant Singh (born 1972), Indian film and television actor and presenter 
Sushant Singh Rajput (1884-2020), Indian actor 
Sushil Kumar Singh (politician) (born 1963), Member of the Lok Sabha, the lower house of the Parliament of India, for Aurangabad, Bihar (1998–1999 and from 2009)
Sushil Kumar Singh (born 1982), Indian footballer
Sushil Singh (born 1976), Member of the Uttar Pradesh Legislative Assembly (from 2017)
Swaran Singh (1907–1994), Indian cabinet minister
Swarup Singh (disambiguation)

T
T. Raja Singh (born 1978), Member of the Telangana Legislative Assembly (from 2014)
T. Sher Singh (Tapishar Sher Singh; born 1949), Canadian lawyer 
Tajinder Singh (born 1992), Indian cricketer
Takht Singh (1819–1873), last Maharaja of Ahmednagar (1841–1843)
Talwinder Singh (born 1994), Indian field hockey player 
Tan Singh (born 1924), Member of the Lok Sabha, the lower house of the Parliament of India, for, (1962–1967, 1977–1980) 
Tara Singh (disambiguation)
Tarjinder Singh (born 1987), Indian first-class cricketer
Tarlochan Singh (born 1933), Press Secretary to President of India (1983–1987), representative of the Indian state of Haryana in the Rajya Sabha, the upper house of the Parlianment of India (2004–2010)
Tarlok Singh (disambiguation)
Tarsem Singh (field hockey) (1946–2005), Indian field hockey player
Tarsem Singh (born 1961), Indian film director
Tavleen Singh (born 1950), Indian columnist, political reporter and writer
Tej Singh (disambiguation)
Teja Singh (disambiguation)
Tejeshwar Singh (1947–2007), Indian publisher, journalist, newscaster and theater activist
Tejpal Singh (born 1949), Member of the Uttar Pradesh Legislative Assembly (1993–1995, 2002–2007, and from 2012)
Thakur Ram Singh (disambiguation)
Thakur Vishva Narain Singh (1928–2009), Indian journalist and Braille editor
Thoi Singh (born 1990), Indian footballer
Thoiba Singh (born 1961), Indian field hockey player
Tiffany Singh (born 1978), New Zealand artist
Tiger Ali Singh (Gurjit Singh Hans; born 1971), Indo-Canadian professional wrestler, son of Tiger Jeet Singh (Jagjeet Singh Hans)
Tiger Jeet Singh (Jagjeet Singh Hans; born 1944), Indo-Canadian professional wrestler
Tikam Singh (born 1968), Indian cricketer
Tom Singh (born 1949), founder of the New Look chain of fashion stores in the United Kingdom
Tomba Singh (born 1982), Indian football midfielder
Toni-Ann Singh (born 1996), Jamaican American singer and beauty queen
Tony Singh (disambiguation)
Trilochan Singh (1923–2008), Indian field hockey player

U
Udai Singh (disambiguation)
Udanta Singh (born 1996), Indian footballer
Uday Singh (disambiguation)
Udham Singh (disambiguation)
Ujjal Singh (1895–1983), Governor of the Indian states of Punjab (1965–1966) and Tamil Nadu (1966–1967)
Upasana Singh (born 1970), Indian actress and stand-up comedian
Upinder Singh, head of the History Department at the University of Delhi
Urmila Singh (born 1946), Governor of the Indian state of Himachal Pradesh (2010–2015)
Uttam Singh (born 1948), Indian music director and violinist

V
V. P. Singh (1931–2008), Prime Minister of India (1989–1990)
Vijay Singh (disambiguation)
Vijender Singh (born 1985), Indian boxer
Vikram Singh (disambiguation)
Vindu Dara Singh (born 1964), Indian film and television actor
Vir Singh (disambiguation)
Virat Singh, Indian cricketer 
Virbhadra Singh (1934–2021), Indian politician
Virendra Singh (disambiguation)
  Vishal Singh (born 16 January 1974), Indian TV actor 
Vivek Singh (disambiguation)

W
Wilmeth Sidat-Singh (1918–1943), African-American basketball and football player

Y
Yadavindra Singh (1914–1974), Indian cricketer, Maharaja of Patiala (from 1938), Rajpramukh of the Patiala and East Punjab States Union
Yadwinder Singh (born 1986), Indian basketball player
Yashwant Singh (disambiguation)
Yo Yo Honey Singh (born 1983), Indian rapper
Yograj Singh (born 1958), Indian cricketer
Yudhvir Singh (1897–1983), Indian freedom fighter and politician
Yuvraj Singh (born 1981), Indian cricketer

Z
Zail Singh (1916–1994), President of India (1982–1987)
Zorawar Singh (disambiguation)

Fictional characters
David Singh, DC Comics character
Himmat Singh, character in Special OPS
Khan Noonien Singh, villain in Star Trek
Bauaa Singh, protagonist in Zero
Sartaj Singh, character in Sacred Games
Jarjit Singh, character in Upin & Ipin

See also
Matt Sing (born 1975), Australian rugby league footballer

Lists of people by surname